Pellegrini may refer to:

People
Pellegrini (surname), an Italian surname

Cities
Carlos Pellegrini, Santa Fe, a city in Santa Fe Province, Argentina
Pellegrini, Buenos Aires, a city in Buenos Aires Province, Argentina

Fish
Labeo pellegrini, species of fish
Labeobarbus pellegrini, species of ray-finned fish
Trachinus pellegrini, Cape Verde weever
Rheocles pellegrini, species of rainbow fish
Eleotris pellegrini, species of fish
Cyprinus pellegrini, species of cyprinid fish
Ctenopoma pellegrini, species of fish

Other
Gran Premio Carlos Pellegrini, Argentine horse race
Carlos Pellegrini (Buenos Aires Metro), a metro station in Buenos Aires, Argentina
Escuela Superior de Comercio Carlos Pellegrini, a High School in Argentina
Pellegrini Avenue (Rosario), an avenue in Rosario, Argentina.
Pellegrini's Espresso Bar, a café in Melbourne, Australia
Pellegrini Lake, an artificial lake located on the Argentine Patagonia